Hinrichsen is a surname. Notable people with the surname include:

 Diederich Hinrichsen (born 1939), German mathematician
 Eric Hinrichsen (born 1976), Canadian basketball player
 Henri Hinrichsen (1868–1942), German publisher
 Niels Hinrichsen (born 1942), Danish actor
 Siegmund Hinrichsen (1841–1902), German banker and politician
 Silke Hinrichsen (1957–2012), German politician (SSW)
 William H. Hinrichsen (1850–1907), American politician